Minor Works is the first album by J. Tillman released on an official label: Fargo Records. It was completed after three limited CDr albums (Untitled No. 1, I Will Return and Long May You Run, J. Tillman) and a tour EP (Documented).

J. Tillman said about the album: "This album is pretty different from anything I've done before. For instance, it's the first time that I've used a drum kit... And then, before, I mainly wrote blues numbers or murder ballads. My new songs took almost a year to mature, which was how long it took me to complete the recording."

Tillman also said, in an interview for SCTAS, that "'Minor Works' was conceived in a very complete way; I had the majority of the arrangements and instrumentation mapped out way ahead of time. I knew I wanted to take a stab at making a studio record. One of the main focal points was that I knew I wanted drums. The album was kind of a writing exercise for me, as in "I know I can write ballads, what would it sound like if I tried to write rock songs?" And obviously, they did not turn out to be rock songs. So, in some respects, that record is kind of a failed experiment."

Track listing

References

External links
J. Tillman official website
Fargo Records

2006 albums
Josh Tillman albums
Fargo Records albums